The University Statisticians of the Southern Experiment Stations (USSES) was a coalition of southern Universities formed in the mid-1960s for the purpose of coordinating efforts in the development of statistical software.  This coalition was largely motivated by introduction of the IBM System/360, which required the reprogramming of all software developed on previous IBM models.

North Carolina State University played a leading role within the coalition because they had a larger programming staff and were well funded through a grant from the National Institute of Health.

See also
 Anthony James Barr
 Gertrude Mary Cox
 James Goodnight
 SAS System

References 

Statistical organizations in the United States